The International Astronomical Union at its XVIth General Assembly in Grenoble in 1976, accepted (Resolution No. 1) a whole new consistent set of astronomical constants recommended for reduction of astronomical observations, and for computation of ephemerides.  It superseded the IAU's previous recommendations of 1964 (see IAU (1964) System of Astronomical Constants), became in effect in the Astronomical Almanac from 1984 onward, and remained in use until the introduction of the IAU (2009) System of Astronomical Constants.  In 1994 the IAU recognized that the parameters became outdated, but retained the 1976 set for sake of continuity, but also recommended to start maintaining a set of "current best estimates".

this "sub group for numerical standards" had published a list, which included new constants (like those for relativistic time scales).

The system of constants was prepared by Commission 4 on ephemerides led by P. Kenneth Seidelmann (after whom asteroid 3217 Seidelmann is named).

At the time, a new standard epoch (J2000.0) was accepted; followed later by a new reference system with fundamental catalogue (FK5), and expressions for precession of the equinoxes,
and in 1979 by new expressions for the relation between Universal Time and sidereal time, and in 1979 and 1980 by a theory of nutation.  There were no reliable rotation elements for most planets, but a joint working group on Cartographic Coordinates and Rotational Elements was installed to compile recommended values.

Units 
The IAU(1976) system is based on the astronomical system of units:
 The astronomical unit of time is the day (D) of 86,400 SI seconds, which is close to the mean solar day of civil clock time.
 The astronomical unit of mass is the mass of the Sun (S).
This astronomical unit is approximately the mean distance between the Earth and the Sun. The value of k is the angular velocity in radians per day (i.e. the daily mean motion) of an infinitesimally small mass that moves around the Sun in a circular orbit at a distance of 1 AU.

Table of constants

Other quantities for use in the preparation of ephemerides

References

External links 
IAU commission 4: , 

Astronomy
Physical constants
Constants